Provincial Road 525 (PR 525) is a short provincial road in southeastern Manitoba, Canada.  It is a remote gravel road that runs from PR 308 east to the Canada–United States border at Northwest Angle, a practical exclave of Minnesota.

PR 525 provides the only land access to Northwest Angle from either country.  The border crossing is unmanned; travelers must report to the Canadian or American authorities via a remote video connection from Northwest Angle prior to departure or upon arrival.

See also
List of Canada–United States border crossings
Unorganized Division No. 1, Manitoba

References

External links
Official Manitoba Highway Map

525